Lasianthus macrocalyx, synonym Lasianthus grandifolius, is a species of flowering plant in the family Rubiaceae, endemic to Tanzania. It was first described by Karl Moritz Schumann  in 1900.

References

Flora of Tanzania
macrocalyx
Vulnerable plants
Taxonomy articles created by Polbot